The voiced bilabial affricate ( in IPA) is a rare affricate consonant that is initiated as a bilabial stop  and released as a voiced bilabial fricative . It has not been reported to occur phonemically in any language.

Features 
Features of the voiced bilabial affricate:

Occurrence

Notes

References

External links
 

Affricates
Bilabial consonants
Pulmonic consonants
Voiced oral consonants
Central consonants